Time Stream or timestream may refer to:

 Timestream, a metaphorical conception of time
 Time Stream (Toshiko Akiyoshi Trio album), 1984
 Time Stream: Toshiko Plays Toshiko, a 1996 album by Toshiko Akiyoshi
 The Time Stream, a 1946 novel by John Taine